National Secondary Route 113, or just Route 113 (or ) is a National Road Route of Costa Rica, located in the Heredia province.

Description
In Heredia province the route covers Heredia canton (Heredia district), Barva canton (San Pablo, San José de la Montaña districts), San Rafael canton (San Rafael, San Josecito, Santiago, Ángeles districts).

References

Highways in Costa Rica